Ken Tamplin (born December 11, 1963) is an American vocal coach, YouTuber, and former Christian rock performer. Founder of Ken Tamplin Vocal Academy, Tamplin is known for his vocal range and vocal training methods. He has contributed to his solo albums as a singer-songwriter, musician, arranger, record producer, and audio engineer (mixing and mastering). Tamplin has also composed music for television, movies, and commercials.

Early years
Tamplin began playing guitar at age six and singing at age nine. Despite being raised in a Christian home, he was not openly Christian until some time before he began his musical career. "I've been on fire for Him ever since", Tamplin was quoted as saying.

Career
Tamplin is one of the founding members of the group Shout, along with Chuck King. He is also the winner of four GMA Dove Awards, including Hard Music Album of the Year at the 25th GMA Dove Awards in 1994, for his album Tamplin; and received 12 nominations.

In the 1980s, he auditioned for the German heavy metal band Accept, invited by producer Dieter Dierks.

In 2001, Tamplin produced the album Make Me Your Voice, featuring gospel singer Andraé Crouch, to help raise funds for Christian groups working in Sudan.

He has also managed surfers and models Aamion Goodwin and Daize Shayne.

Tamplin also runs the Ken Tamplin Vocal Academy. Former students include Gabriela Gunčíková, who later went on to success with the Trans-Siberian Orchestra and to represent the Czech Republic at Eurovision; and Xiomara Crystal, a featured singer on the Rock Meets Classic tour.

Personal life
Tamplin is married and has two children, including a son. He also has a brother, Lance, who is a pastor; and with whom he started Living Stones Fellowship in 2001, which was based at the La Tierra Elementary school in Mission Viejo—where he served as a worship director.

He is a cousin to former Van Halen frontman, current Chickenfoot and The Circle frontman, and solo recording artist Sammy Hagar. Hagar said of Tamplin in an interview: "I've only met him once. But you know, he sends me his records and all that stuff."

Tamplin was a resident of Costa Mesa, California; and co-owned Music Painter Studios with Robert Hart, located at the nearby Santa Ana Heights. He currently lives with his wife in Flagstaff, Arizona, and his academy and studio are based in Sedona.

Bands
 Joshua
 Magdallan
 Shout
 Tamplin

Film credits 
source:
 The Punisher
 Lionheart
 Wild America
 The Waterboy
 Charlie's Angels
 The Mod Squad
 Major League: Back to the Minors
 Inspector Gadget
 To End All Wars
 Hot Tub Time Machine
 Flicka

Television credits 

source:
 Bad Girls Club
 The Hills
 The Real World
 A Double Shot at Love
 Bromance
 Sex and the City
 Malcolm in the Middle
 Baywatch
 The Ex Files
 Friends
 Entertainment Tonight
 Melrose Place
 Sister, Sister
 The Howie Mandel Show
 Wall of Separation
 Tosh.0

Additional credits
 Kiss – Carnival of Souls: The Final Sessions
 Illegal Tender Band – Heaven Rocks

Discography
In addition to the bands mentioned above, Ken Tamplin sung and played on these albums.

Albums
 1984 – Joshua  – Surrender
 1987 – Shout – It Won't Be Long
 1988 – Shout – In Your Face
 1989 – Angelica – Angelica
 1989 – The Power Team – Take 'Em Back
 1990 – Tamplin and Friends – An Axe to Grind
 1991 – Ken Tamplin – Soul Survivor
 1991 – Magdallan – Big Bang
 1992 – Rock Of The 80's – Volume 1
 1993 – Tamplin – Tamplin
 1993 – Hollywood Hairspray – Volume 2
 1994 – Shout – At The Top Of Their Lungs
 1995 – Tamplin – In the Witness Box
 1995 – Ken Tamplin – We the People
 1995 – Ken Tamplin – Goin' Home
 1996 – Magdallan – End Of The Ages
 1997 – Ken Tamplin – Liquid Music Compilation
 1997 – Ken Tamplin – The Colors of Christmas
 1997 – Shout – Back
 1998 – Major League Soundtrack – Back To The Minors
 1999 – Ken Tamplin – Brave Days of Old
 2001 – Ken Tamplin – Where Love Is
 2001 – Ken Tamplin – Make Me Your Voice 1
 2002 – Laudamus – Lost In Vain
 2003 – Ken Tamplin and Friends – Wake the Nations
 2004 – Ken Tamplin – Make Me Your Voice 2
 2009 – Ken Tamplin – How Sweet the Sound (Spring Hill Music U.S.)
 2011 – Ken Tamplin – Got You Covered Vol 1
 2011 – Ken Tamplin – Got You Covered Vol 2
 2011 – Ken Tamplin – Got You Covered Vol 3
 2011 – Ken Tamplin – Got You Covered Vol 4
 2011 – Ken Tamplin – Got You Covered Vol 5
 2011 – Ken Tamplin – Got You Covered Vol 6
 2012 – Ken Tamplin – Then Sings My Soul
 2012 – Ken Tamplin – Superstar Medleys
 2014 – Ken Tamplin – Ballads of Ken Tamplin Vol 1

References

External links

 
 
 
 Profile at No Life Til Metal

1963 births
20th-century American composers
20th-century American guitarists
20th-century American male singers
20th-century American male writers
20th-century American singers
20th-century Christians
21st-century American composers
21st-century American guitarists
21st-century American male singers
21st-century American male writers
21st-century American singers
21st-century Christians
American audio engineers
American Christian writers
American hard rock musicians
American male film score composers
American male guitarists
American male singer-songwriters
American performers of Christian music
American rock guitarists
American rock singers
American rock songwriters
American vocal coaches
American YouTubers
Christian metal musicians
Christian music songwriters
Educational and science YouTubers
Engineers from Arizona
Engineers from California
Engineers from Georgia (U.S. state)
Guitarists from Arizona
Guitarists from California
Guitarists from Georgia (U.S. state)
Jingle composers
Joshua (band) members
Living people
Magdallan members
Male television composers
Mastering engineers
Music YouTubers
People from Costa Mesa, California
People from Marietta, Georgia
People from Sedona, Arizona
Record producers from Arizona
Record producers from California
Record producers from Georgia (U.S. state)
Singer-songwriters from Arizona
Singer-songwriters from California
Singer-songwriters from Georgia (U.S. state)
Singers with a four-octave vocal range
Shout (band) members
Zomba Group of Companies artists